Bungku is a town and the administrative centre of the Regency of Morowali, in Central Sulawesi Province of Indonesia.

Bungku was originally not the capital of Morowali Regency. In 1999, the capital of Morowali Regency was Kolonodale. In 2004, the plan to shift the Morowali capital southeast from Kolonodale to Bungku left non-Bungku residents, both Protestant and Muslim, feeling further disenfranchised. Accordingly in 2013 a separate North Morowali Regency (with its capital at Kolonodale) was established by separating the northwesterly districts from Morowali Regency.

The city is served by Maleo Airport, opened in March 2017.

Climate
Bungku has a tropical rainforest climate (Af) with moderate rainfall from September to November and heavy rainfall from December to August.

References

Populated places in Central Sulawesi
Regency seats of Central Sulawesi